Garry Hay (born 7 September 1977 in Irvine, North Ayrshire) is a Scottish former professional footballer, who played in over 300 Scottish Premier League games for Kilmarnock.

Club career
Hay signed for Kilmarnock in 1995, and made his debut against Rangers on the opening day of the 1999–2000 season. Hay scored two goals in his second game for Kilmarnock against Aberdeen. He started his career mainly as a left midfielder, but eventually moved to a more defensive role.

Hay, who has had several stints as Kilmarnock team captain, had a testimonial year during the 2009–10 season. He played in the 2012 Scottish League Cup Final, which Kilmarnock won 1–0 against Celtic. Two months later, Hay extended his contract with Kilmarnock for another season. Hay was released by Kilmarnock in June 2013. He then turned down the offer of a joint playing and coaching contract at Oldham Athletic. He joined Airdrieonians in the summer of 2013, playing his final professional football game v Ayr United at Somerset Park on 31 August 2013. He then moved to a full-time role with the Scottish Football Association, which meant that he could no longer be associated with an individual club.

International career
Hay received international recognition when he was capped by the Scotland B team in a game against Poland at Rugby Park on 6 December 2005, when the Scots ran out 2–0 victors.

Honours

Kilmarnock
Scottish League Cup: 2012

References

External links

Kilmarnock FC profile

1977 births
Living people
Footballers from Irvine, North Ayrshire
Association football fullbacks
Scottish footballers
Scotland B international footballers
Kilmarnock F.C. players
Airdrieonians F.C. players
Scottish Premier League players
Scottish Professional Football League players
Scottish men's futsal players